Grinevsky (feminine: Grinevskaya) is a Russian-language surname transliterated from the Polish surname Hryniewski

Alexandr Grinevsky, birth name of Alexander Grin, Russian writer
Oleg Grinevsky (1930-2019), Russian diplomat
Isabella Grinevskaya (1864-1944), Russian-Jewish writer

Polish-language surnames
Russian-language surnames